Amsterdam is an unincorporated community in Twin Falls County, Idaho, United States, roughly  south-southwest of Twin Falls. Amsterdam is located along U.S. Route 93. Amsterdam had a post office 1912–1954.

Amsterdam is part of the Twin Falls, Idaho Metropolitan Statistical Area.

See also

References

Unincorporated communities in Idaho
Unincorporated communities in Twin Falls County, Idaho